Long Gone Gulch is an American 2D animated adventure-fantasy Western comedy web series created, directed, written and produced by Tara Billinger, of The Wonderful World of Mickey Mouse shorts, and Zach Bellissimo, of Victor & Valentino and Rick and Morty, based on a successful Kickstarter campaign in 2016. The pilot episode premiered on January 11, 2021. Unlike other series in 2021, it debuted on YouTube. The beginning of the pilot has a content warning saying that the animation contains scenes with cartoon violence, images with flashes, and "scary content" not suitable for those under age 7.

Premise 
Snag and Rawhide, sheriffs in a place known as "The Gulch", end up in trouble with the town's mayor after a job gone wrong, and have to fight for "what they care about most", while facing other weird and sleazy characters along the way.

Characters 
 Rawhide (voiced by E. G. Daily is a 16-year-old human sheriff in the Gulch who is employed by the mayor and a friend of Snag, who is skilled with fighting, especially using her slingshot, and can think on her feet. Her dad died under unknown circumstances and is buried not far outside the town. Her hair is always covering her left eye, and she enjoys collecting, sweets, and history, while disliking liars, villains, and varmints.
 Snag (voiced by Danny Cooksey is another human sheriff in the town who is friends with Rawhide, uses a special comb as a weapon, and is 17 years old. He enjoys rock n' roll, thrill seeking, and monster films, while he dislikes books, hard work, and authority.
 BW (voiced by Amber Midthunder) is a 21-year-old sardonic bounty hunter and Native American human who hangs around the saloon. She likes to mess with Rawhide and Snag. According to series creator Zach Bellissimo, the "BW" in her name does not mean anything. She is also older and taller than Rawhide and Snag.
 Mayor Rhubarb (voiced by Myke Chilian) is the neurotic and short-tempered mayor of The Gulch and is a jackalope of an old age. He employed Rawhide and Snag as sheriffs, but hates their guts. 
 Squatch and Pinchley (voiced by Piotr Michael) are best friends of Rawhide and Snag. Squatch is a burnt-out sasquatch, while Pinchley is a happy and dimwitted humanoid cactus, and both hang about the local saloon.
 Mako (voiced by Eric Bauza) is an outlaw and a land-walking shark (likely a mako shark) living in the Gulch who hates the sheriffs. He has four henchman (also land-walking sea creatures) who work with him: Frisco the wolffish, Enzo the pink crab, Groggy the green crab, and Klaus the moray eel.
 Marigold (voiced by Erin Fitzgerald) is the secretary of the mayor, who is another jackalope, the love interest of the Mayor Rhubarb, and was briefly persuaded easily to join Mako's gang because of the offer of "cheaper healthcare".

Episodes

Pilot (2021)

Production and release
In 2015, the project was officially posted online. However, the creators had been working with the show's concept since 2010 or earlier. The following year, a Kickstarter was begun for the series. It crowdfunded for five years after that point. The same year, a one-minute trailer was released. For that trailer, the art, character design, storyboarding, and animation, was divided between Tara Billinger and Zach Bellissimo, while Michael J. Ruocco did additional animation scenes, and Sam Mckenzie put together text and logo design. At the time, the goal was to release a pilot episode 8–11 minutes long, creating a western-themed show that isn't a parody, which would appeal to those who like The Mighty Boosh, Mad Max, Alice in Wonderland, and The Good, the Bad and the Ugly. In June 2018, the official Tumblr for the show stated that programs like Flash CC and Animate were used for the animation and are independently producing this, not going through a studio. At the time, it was said that the pilot would be released in early 2019, but, in December 2019, the release date was pushed back to 2020.

On November 27, 2018, the official trailer for the series was first released on YouTube.

On January 11, 2021, the pilot for the series was released. The crew, headed by creators Zach Bellissimo and Tara Billinger, included animators like Nigel, art directors such as Daniaelle and Trevor Simonsen, writers like Karl Handrika, and many other individuals. Others on the crew included Trevor Von Klueg as technical director, Zach Bellissimo as animation director, Zach Bellissimo and Tara Billinger doing character design, Bryan Velayo and Louis Pieper engaging in composting,  Bob Pepek as re-recording mixer, and Tara Billinger as production manager.The finished pilot expanded from the originally planned length of 8–11 minutes long to over 21 minutes.

In June 2021, J.D. Wilkes & the Legendary Shack Shakers presented their newest single, "Rawhide," which mixes animated scenes from the pilot and other public domain footage from Terror of Tiny Town. Wilkes had performed "Bible, Candle, & A Skull" in the pilot.

Reception 
When the show's pilot was released in January 2021, it was positively reviewed. Matthew Field of Go & Express, a South African newspaper, called the episode "light-hearted fun," saying that everything about it is great, with a strong cast, "superb" animation, and it is aimed at a "young audience," meaning it never goes above "PG levels," meaning that those of all ages can "enjoy the fun." Chris Perkins of Animation for Adults reviewed the series. In 2016, before the pilot was released, he said that what had been posted on the Kickstarter indicated that the series would be right at home alongside shows like Gravity Falls and Steven Universe. In the review of the pilot, he described it as a "real treat for animation fans everywhere," with distinct and unique character designs, is inventive, and has strong visuals, adding that influences of the Mickey Mouse shorts and Rick and Morty can be seen in the series. He further said that the more publicity the pilot gets, it makes it more possible that a channel like Cartoon Network or streaming service such as Amazon Prime or Netflix would pick it up for a full series.

Lena Nikolaeva of the Russian television channel 2×2 reviewed the episode as well, saying that the two protagonists "complement each other perfectly," and argued that when watching the episode various times, viewers will find "something new and fun" everytime, with the pilot a "combination of serious themes...and hilarious scenes." Nikolaeva hoped that the episode will have a big effect and then be taken to bigger animation studios. Margaret Troup of the Iowa State Daily positively reviewed the pilot, giving it a rating of 8.5/10, calling it a "fast-paced, Western-style slapstick comedy and action," saying that fans and creators of the episode have hoped that a TV production studio would pick up the series like the case with Hazbin Hotel. She also noted that the series is more family-friendly than Helluva Boss or Hazbin Hotel, even though some swearing, blood, and cartoon violence makes it "mature enough for older audiences to enjoy in addition to children," and praised the pilot's animation, saying it is akin to Kim Possible and The Powerpuff Girls. Even so, she said that the voice acting of Daily, Cooksey, and Midthunder could all use improvement in one way or another, while hoping for the series gets "picked up by a professional production company." Additionally, animators such as Vivienne Medrano and Jorge R. Gutierrez, voice actor Matt Danner, and cartoonist Kevin Sukho Lee, among others praised the episode.

Notes

References

External links
Official website	

2020s YouTube series
2021 web series debuts
Fantasy web series
American animated web series

Native Americans in popular culture
Western (genre) animated television series